Ashleigh Connor (3 September 1989 – 21 July 2011) was an Australian soccer player, who played for the Central Coast Mariners in the Australian W-League.

Connor made her debut for the Mariners in 2009. She was signed by the Mariners prior to the 2009 W-League season from the NSW Arrive Alive Women's Premier League club Illawarra Stingrays. Her Stingrays strike partner Michelle Heyman was also signed by the Mariners.

Connor played for the Australian national team – the Matildas – in the 2008 FIFA U-20 Women's World Cup Qualifiers during 2007.

Connor also played for the Marconi Stallions (2008) and Macarthur Rams prior to her move to the Stallions at Bossley Park.

On 21 July 2011, Connor was involved in a car accident on Appin Road in Cataract between Wollongong and Campbelltown that led to her death.

References

1989 births
2011 deaths
Australian women's soccer players
Central Coast Mariners FC (A-League Women) players
Road incident deaths in New South Wales
Women's association football forwards